International Socialist Labor Congress, the second congress of the Second International met in Brussels, Belgium from August 16–22, 1891 at the Maison du Peuple, the headquarters of the Belgian Workers Party.

Delegates 

For full list of delegates and the organizations they represented see, below, Congrès international ouvrier socialiste tenu à Bruxelles du 16 au 23 août p. 239-48.

Resolutions 

The congress passed resolutions on the conditions of membership to the congress, international labor legislation, the Jewish question and the rights of women, the position of the working class regarding militarism, and strikes. It also proclaim May 1 a proletarian holiday.

The resolution on the Jewish question originally only condemned anti-Semitism, and stated the liberation of the Jews, as with every other people, would only be brought about by the advent of socialism. It was changed however, on the initiative of Dr. Regnard and M. Argyriades, of France, to condemn both anti-semitic and "philo-semitic" tyranny, noting that many Jewish financiers and banks were "great oppressors of labour".

References 

Haupt, Georges La Deuxième Internationale, 1889-1914: étude critique des sources, essai bibliographique
The Times, Monday, August 17, 1891; pg. 3; Issue 33405; col C Socialist Labour Congress In Brussels.

External links 
Report from Great Britain and Ireland to the Delegates of the Brussels International Congress, 1891., 
"The Times" newsclippings of the 1891 International Socialist congress
Congrès international ouvrier socialiste tenu à Bruxelles du 16 au 23 août 

History of socialism
Second International
1891 conferences
1891 in Belgium